Linnuse may refer to several places in Estonia:

Linnuse, Pärnu County, village in Lääneranna Parish, Lääne County
Linnuse, Lääne-Viru County, village in Viru-Nigula Parish, Lääne-Viru County
Linnuse, Saaremaa Parish, village in Saaremaa Parish, Saare County
Linnuse, Muhu Parish, village in Muhu Parish, Saare County